Turlock station is a future Altamont Corridor Express station in the city of the same name. It is expected to open to revenue service in 2029 as part of the second phase of ACE's expansion to Merced. The station is located at the intersection of Golden State Boulevard and Front Street. The platform is planned to be connected to the Turlock Transit Roger K. Fall Transit Center via an elevated pedestrian bridge. The station is also adjacent to the city's Greyhound Lines bus stop.

References

Turlock, California
Future Altamont Corridor Express stations
Railway stations scheduled to open in 2029
Railway stations in Stanislaus County, California